Dominick Dunne's Power, Privilege, and Justice is an American crime TV series that examined real-life cases of crime, passion, and greed involving privileged or famous people. The episodes were shown on truTV (formerly Court TV) and on Star TV in Canada as well as Zone Reality/CBS Reality in Europe and Bio. in Australia. The host of the show was Dominick Dunne. The series started in 2002 and ended in late 2009 with Dunne's death. Digital multicaster Justice Network currently shows reruns of the program.

List of episodes

Season 1

Season 2

Season 3

Season 4

Season 5

Season 6

Season 7

Season 8

Season 9

Comments
The show started in 2002 and ended with Dunne's death in 2009. Several of the episodes had intersected with his career. The show had "one of the best true-crime writers" of its time, Dominick Dunne. Linda Stasi comments that Dunne reports on the rich and powerful when they kill, and analyses how they are more likely to get away with it, indicating "Dunne nails them - no holds barred." Listed in the Encyclopedia of Television Shows 1925-2010, the series is described to present "a look at the dark side of the law" where the rich and famous try to beat the legal system.

References

 Official site for Dominick Dunne's Power, Privilege and Justice, archived

External links
 

2002 American television series debuts
2000s American documentary television series
2000s American crime television series
TruTV original programming
2009 American television series endings
English-language television shows
True crime television series
Wealth in the United States